Castle Island is a small uninhabited island  off the coast of Hot Water Beach on the Coromandel Peninsula, New Zealand.

References 

Thames-Coromandel District
Landforms of Waikato
Islands of Waikato